Prachee Shah Paandya, also known as Prachi Shah, is an Indian actress and Kathak dancer who appears in Hindi films and television. She is known for her roles in television shows like Kyunki Saas Bhi Kabhi Bahu Thi and Ek Shringaar-Swabhiman.

Early life and career
Shah is a Gujarati Jain by birth but her family has lived in Maharashtra for three generations. In an interview she admitted not knowing how to speak Gujarati but being fluent in Marathi because of her upbringing.

She is a trained Kathak dancer and has performed in dance shows both nationally and internationally. She trained with her guru Ganesh Hiralal ji, of the seventh generation of the Hiralal family of the Jaipur gharana and holds the Guinness World Record for performing 93 spins in one minute and in 2015 was appointed as the Kathak ambassador by the Government of India.

In 2019, Shah attended the Cannes Film Festival moderating a session discussing women in global cinema.

Personal life 
Shah has been married to filmmaker Vishwas Paandya since 9 December 2005. She gave birth to their daughter Khiana in 2009 and subsequently took a year off from work.

Filmography

Film

Television

References

External links
 
 

Actresses in Hindi television
Living people
Indian soap opera actresses
Indian television actresses
Indian film actresses
Gujarati people
Actresses in Hindi cinema
Place of birth missing (living people)
21st-century Indian actresses
Actresses in Gujarati cinema
Year of birth missing (living people)
Actors from Mumbai